A maritime disaster is an accident involving vessels at sea which causes significant damage, injury or loss of life. This list covers notable maritime disasters of the 21st century. Maritime means ship.

Peacetime disasters

All ships are vulnerable to problems from weather conditions, faulty design or human error. Some of the disasters below occurred in periods of conflict, although their losses were unrelated to any military action. The table listings are in descending order of the magnitude of casualties suffered.

Wartime disasters

Al-Qaeda insurgency in Yemen

Korean conflict

Russo-Ukrainian War

See also

 List of maritime disasters
 List of maritime disasters in the 18th century
 List of maritime disasters in the 19th century
 List of maritime disasters in the 20th century
 List of maritime disasters in World War I
 List of maritime disasters in World War II
 Shipwreck
 List of shipwrecks
 List of disasters
 List of accidents and disasters by death toll
 List by death toll of ships sunk by submarines
 List of RORO vessel accidents
 List of migrant vessel incidents on the Mediterranean Sea

References

Lists of shipwrecks
Lists of 21st-century disasters